Charleta B. Tavares is a former member of the Ohio Senate. She represented the 15th District from 2011 to 2018. Her district included much of central Franklin County, including the cities of Bexley and Grandview Heights with the majority encompassing the historic neighborhoods of Columbus, Ohio. Tavares previously had served in the Ohio House of Representatives from 1993 to 1998.

Life and career
Tavares has an extensive public service career starting as the Legislative Assistant to Ray Miller in the Ohio House of Representatives. She also served as Chief of the Children's Protection Section for Ohio Attorney General Lee Fisher prior to her appointment in 1993, as state Representative and the first African-American and Democratic woman to serve in the Legislature from Franklin County in the state's history. Tavares was elected in 1994 and served until 1998. She was elected by her colleagues in 1996 to serve as Minority Whip, making her the first African-American woman ever to hold a leadership position in the Ohio Legislature.

In 1998, Tavares gave up her seat to run unsuccessfully for Ohio Secretary of State. The Republican, J. Kenneth Blackwell won the election. However, Tavares was appointed to Columbus City Council in 1999, and won re-election that year.

Tavares was asked by the Democratic Party in 2002 to run as Lieutenant Governor with her running mate, Tim Hagan who was nominated to run for Governor. They lost the election. She won re-election to City Council in 2003 and 2007.

Ohio Senate
In 2010, Senator Ray Miller was term limited and unable to run for another term in the Ohio Senate. As a result, Tavares, Representative Dan Stewart, and politician novice Oyango Snell ran to replace him. Tavares won the Democratic primary nomination with 52.39% of the vote. She went on to defeat Republican Alicia Healy with 72.8% of the vote.

On January 3, 2011, Tavares was sworn into her first term in the Senate and once again became both the first Democratic and African-American woman to serve in the Ohio Senate from Central Ohio. She is also the first woman Democrat to serve in leadership in both the Ohio House of Representatives and Ohio Senate in Ohio's history.

In 2014, Tavares was elected as Assistant Senate Democratic Leader.  She was re-elected to the Senate 15th District in 2014 with over 73% of the vote. She was also re-elected to her leadership post. Tavares's legislative agenda includes providing benefits and protections for domestic workers, eliminating health disparities, eliminating disparities caused by school expulsions and suspensions, investing in Ohio's infrastructure, and creating equity and racial fairness in the judicial system. She has been an advocate for raising the minimum wage, and for a refundable earned income tax credit.

Committee assignments
Committee on Rules; Ways & Means (Ranking Member); Health and Human Services (Ranking Member); Finance; and Corrections Subcommittee (Finance). She was also appointed to the Joint Committee on Agency Rule Review (JCARR), Joint Medicaid Oversight Committee (JMOC), and the Constitutional Modernization Commission (co-chair).

Electoral history

References

External links
Campaign website, Tavares4senate.com

Women state legislators in Ohio
Living people
Democratic Party members of the Ohio House of Representatives
Democratic Party Ohio state senators
Year of birth missing (living people)
Politicians from Columbus, Ohio
21st-century American politicians
21st-century American women politicians
African-American people in Ohio politics
21st-century African-American women
21st-century African-American politicians